Giga Kick is a Thoroughbred racehorse trained and bred in Australia. He has won The Everest, two group races and over seven million dollars over his career.

Career
Giga Kick made his debut in an 1100m maiden race at Sale on 13 February, 2022. Leading all the way, it was an "impressive" win. He was then spelled for 18 weeks.

After two trials, Giga Kick returned at Flemington on 16 July. Jockey Matthew Cartwright, "capitalised on Giga Kick’s natural speed to have the chestnut near the lead early before the promising sprinter dashed clear to score impressively". Trainer Clayton Douglas said, "The idea to have him in early was that he's only had the one run and he's going to be meeting some pretty experienced horses through the spring. So, this was always going to be more of an educational run."

After a further trial, Giga Kick won the Group 3 Vain Stakes, Douglas's first stakes victory. Five lengths behind at the turn, he won by a long head. Douglas said after the race, "He is still an immature type. He hasn't come in the coat completely, so there is nice improvement."

On 1 October, Giga Kick won the Danehill Stakes. Jumping as odd-on favourite, jockey Craig Williams "looked to be under pressure from Buenos Noches from the 300m mark all the way until the finish line" but hung on "to win by a nostril". Williams said, "there's a lot that we and I will learn out of today with this horse, the way that he is developing and he is really, apart from being undefeated and winning today and off to the Coolmore, he is a really exciting horse."

Two weeks later, Giga Kick won The Everest, Australia's richest horse race. One of the last horses to be nominated for the race, Giga Kick jumped at $21, with Nature Strip, the previous year's winner, the odds-on favourite. Tenth with 400 metres to go, he "produced an explosive finish to reel in his older rivals".

Pedigree

References

2019 racehorse births
Racehorses bred in Australia
Racehorses trained in Australia